Peterson House may refer to:

 J. B. Doughterty and C. W. Peterson House, Phoenix, Arizona, listed on the National Register of Historic Places (NRHP) in Phoenix
 Peterson House (Albany, California), listed on the NRHP in Alameda County
 Peterson House (Lakewood, Colorado), NRHP-listed
 Peterson and Mustard's Hermitage Farm, Smyrna, Delaware, NRHP-listed
 Peterson-Wilbanks House, Vidalia, Georgia, NRHP-listed
 Lake-Peterson House, Rockford, Illinois, NRHP-listed
 Max Peterson House, Davenport, Iowa, NRHP-listed
 Brugjeld-Peterson Family Farmstead District, Wallingford, Iowa, NRHP-listed
 Peterson-Dumesnil House, Louisville, Kentucky, NRHP-listed
 Smith-Peterson House, Newton, Massachusetts, NRHP-listed
 Andrew Peterson Farmstead, Waconia, Minnesota, NRHP-listed
 Peterson House (Bozeman, Montana), listed on the NRHP in Montana
 Peter Peterson Farmstead, Waverly, Nebraska, NRHP-listed
 Streeter-Peterson House, Aurora, Nebraska, NRHP-listed
 John N. Peterson Farm, Poplar, North Carolina, NRHP-listed in Mitchell County
 J. H. Peterson Machine Shop, Portland, Oregon, listed on the NRHP in Oregon
 Carol Peterson House, Pittsburgh, Pennsylvania
William G. Milne House, also known as Peterson House, in Dell Rapids, South Dakota, NRHP-listed
 Mathias Peterson Homestead, Mission Hill, South Dakota, listed on the NRHP in South Dakota
 Peterson-Loriks House, Oldham, South Dakota, listed on the NRHP in South Dakota
 George A. Peterson House, Austin, Texas, listed on the NRHP in Texas
 Canute Peterson House, Ephraim, Utah, NRHP-listed
 Peterson-Burr House, Salina, Utah, listed on the NRHP in Utah
 Mickelson, Hyrum and Mary A. Terry Peterson, House, Sandy, Utah, listed on the NRHP in Utah
 Charles Peterson House, Sandy, Utah, listed on the NRHP in Utah
 Peter Peterson House, Ephraim, Wisconsin, listed on the NRHP in Wisconsin
 Seth Peterson Cottage, Lake Delton, Wisconsin, NRHP-listed

See also
 Petersen House (disambiguation)
 Peterson Farm (disambiguation)